Passport validity is the length of time a passport can be used to travel to another country, or be used as a valid form of identification within or outside the issuing country before its date of expiration.

Adult passport validity map

Adult passports

There is an increasing trend for adult passports to be valid for ten years, such as a United Kingdom passport, United States Passport, New Zealand Passport (after 30 November 2015) or Australian passport. A five year period of validity is also common (as used to be the situation for a Papua New Guinean passport or currently for an Indonesian passport). Some countries issue adult passports for periods between five and ten years, such as the Cuban passport, which is valid for six years.

Optional validity period
Some countries allow adult applicants to choose a passport validity, usually 5 or 10 years, at a varying price scale, e.g. costing more for 10 years than 5 years. These countries include Canada, Hungary, Japan, Mexico (1, 3, 6, or 10), Pakistan, Russia, South Korea, and Turkey.

Child and young adult passports
Most countries issue passports for children and young adults for five years, under passport issuing protocols a child or young adult passport is defined as being under 16 years for a United States Passport, under 19 years for a Japanese Passport, under 21 years for a Croatian passport, under 24 years for a German passport or under 30 years as is the case with a Spanish passport.

Infant passports
Because children change rapidly in appearance from infancy to age five, some countries issue infant passports for two years, such as the Austrian passport, or for one year in the case of the Republic of Korea passport.

Validity on arrival
Many countries require passports to have a remaining validity of six months or more on the date of arrival.

Countries requiring passport validity of at least 6 months on arrival include Afghanistan, Algeria, Bhutan, Botswana, Brunei, Cambodia, Canada,  Comoros, Côte d'Ivoire, Ecuador, Egypt, El Salvador, Fiji, Guyana, Indonesia, Iran, Iraq (except when arriving at Basra - 3 months and Erbil or Sulaimaniyah - on arrival), Israel, Kenya, Laos, Madagascar, Malaysia, Marshall Islands, Mexico, Myanmar, Namibia, Nicaragua, Nigeria, Oman, Palau, Papua New Guinea,  Rwanda, Saint Lucia, Samoa, Saudi Arabia, Singapore, Solomon Islands, Sri Lanka, Suriname, Taiwan, Tanzania, Thailand, Timor-Leste, Tonga, Turkey, Tuvalu, Uganda, Vanuatu, Venezuela, Vietnam

Countries requiring passport validity of at least 4 months on arrival include Micronesia, Zambia

Countries requiring passport validity of at least 3 months on arrival include  Schengen Area countries, Georgia, Honduras, Iceland, Jordan, Kuwait, Lebanon, Moldova, Nauru, Panama, United Arab Emirates

And countries requiring passport validity of at least 1 month on arrival include Philippines,  Eritrea, Hong Kong, Macao, New Zealand, South Africa.

Other countries require either a passport valid on arrival or passport valid throughout the period of intended stay.

Adult passport validity by country

1 – Involuntary limitation of passport validity for young adults.
2 – Extended validity for senior citizens only.

References

Passports